was a Japanese novelist and author of children's stories from Hiroshima.

Biography

Suzuki was born in Hiroshima. He studied English literature at Tokyo Imperial University (now the University of Tokyo), and later launched a children's literature magazine called 赤い鳥 (Akai tori / Red Bird) in 1918. Unusually for its time, the journal emphasized learning from observation and experience rather than rote learning, and focused on everyday language as much as ceremonial language. 196 issues were published.

Major works
Suzuki's major works include:

See also
Japanese literature
List of Japanese authors

References

External links

 e-texts of Miekichi Suzuki's works at Aozora Bunko 
 
 

1882 births
1936 deaths
Japanese writers
Writers from Hiroshima
Japanese magazine founders